The following is a list of annual leaders in putouts in Major League Baseball (MLB), with separate lists for the American League and the National League. The list also includes several professional leagues and associations that were never part of MLB.

In baseball statistics, a putout (denoted by PO or fly out when appropriate) is given to a defensive player who records an out by a Tagging a runner with the ball when he is not touching a base (a tagout), catching a batted or thrown ball and tagging a base to put out a batter or runner (a Force out), catching a thrown ball and tagging a base to record an out on an appeal play, catching a third strike (a strikeout), catching a batted ball on the fly (a flyout), or being positioned closest to a runner called out for interference.

Jake Beckley is the all-time leader in career putouts with 23,743. Jiggs Donahue holds the record for most putouts in a season with 1,846 in 1907. Frank McCormick, Steve Garvey, Bill Terry, and Ernie Banks have all led the league in putouts 5 times. Albert Pujols is the active leader in putouts and has led the league 4 times.



American League

National League

American Association

National Association

Union Association

Player's League

Federal League

References

Baseball-Reference.com

Major League Baseball statistics
Putouts